Magaribuchi Dam is a gravity dam located in Fukuoka Prefecture in Japan. The dam is used for water supply. The catchment area of the dam is 11.4 km2. The dam impounds about 19  ha of land when full and can store 1422 thousand cubic meters of water. The construction of the dam was started on 1916 and completed in 1922.

Its ground consolidation was improved in 1990.

References

Dams in Fukuoka Prefecture
1922 establishments in Japan